Oleg Solodovnik (born December 11, 1966 in Dnepropetrovsk, USSR) is a Russian and Ukrainian futsal coach, as well as a former football and futsal player. He is notable for his performance in the Russian futsal club Dina Moscow and National teams of USSR, CIS, Russia and Ukraine.

Biography
Solodovnik started playing football in 1982 in football school №12 of Dnepropetrovsk. In 1989, he was invited in the local futsal club Mehanizator. There he won USSR Futsal Cup and participated in USSR Futsal Championship. He performed well and was invited to Dina Moscow.
 
In Dina he spent two seasons and won two titles of Russian champion. After Dina he played a little bit in Fenix (Chelyabinsk) and moved to USA, where for three months was playing for Pittsburgh Stingers. Then he moved back to Ukraine and played there for Mehanizator-Metallist, Interkas and Shakhtar Donetsk.
 
Solodovnik played in most matches of USSR and CIS National teams. With Russian national team he participated in Futsal World Championship 1992. After that Oleg made his debut in Ukraine national team.
 
In 2001 Solodovnik became the head coach of Shakhtar Donetsk. He spent in the club 8 years, won five national championships, three national cups and became the most titled coach in the history of Ukrainian futsal.
 
In 2010-12 worked in Georgian futsal club Iberia Star. Until 2014 trained futsal club Enakieyevets, situated in Donetsk region. In 2014 due to war he left the region and moved to Kazakhstan.

Since August 2016 he has been a head coach of Kazahstan team "Aktobe".

Achievements

Player
CIS champion: 1992
Russian champion: 1992/93, 1993/94
USSR Futsal Cup: 1991
Russian Cup: 1992-1993
Cup winner of major league: 1993
Ukrainian Cup: 1999

Coach
Ukrainian champion: 2002, 2004, 2005, 2006, 2008
Ukrainian Cup: 2003, 2004, 2006
Georgian champion: 2011
Bronze medallist of Kazahstan championship: 2016-2017

References

External links
ffu.org profile

1966 births
Living people
Russian men's futsal players
MFK Dina Moskva players